Smt Sushree Devi a politician from Biju Janata Dal is a Member of the Parliament of India representing Orissa in the Rajya Sabha, the upper house of the Indian Parliament.

References

External links
 Profile on Rajya Sabha website

Biju Janata Dal politicians
Rajya Sabha members from Odisha
Living people
Women in Odisha politics
Year of birth missing (living people)
Women members of the Rajya Sabha